Birendra Kumar Bhattacharya  (14 October 1924 – 6 August 1997) was an Indian writer. He was one of the pioneers of modern Assamese literature. He was the first ever Assamese writer to receive the Jnanpith Award, which was awarded to him in the year 1979 for his novel Mrityunjay (Immortal), followed by Indira Goswami in 2001. He was also a recipient of Sahitya Akademi Award in Assamese in 1961 for his Assamese novel Iyaruingam, which is considered a masterpiece of Indian literature. In 2005, a translation of the work published by Katha Books with the title Love in the Time of Insurgency was released. Another famous novel written by Bhattacharya is Aai (Mother).

He was the President of Asam Sahitya Sabha (Assam Literary Society) during 1983-1985. In 1997, Bhattacharyya died due to a brief illness at the private college hospital in Guwahati.

Editor of 'Ramdhenu'

Dr Birendra Kumar Bhattacharya earned the respect of the entire Assamese modern literary sphere for playing a very crucial torch-bearer's role in discovering, nurturing and promoting young literary talents in Assam from 1960s as the Editor of the historic Assamese literary journal Ramdhenu. His role as the Editor of this milestone Assamese literary journal was so prominent and effective that the entire period of its publication in the mid-20th century in Assam is still referred as revered as Ramdhenu Era of Assamese literature. This Ramdhenu Era is deemed to be the golden era of in the long journey of the modern Assamese literature.

All the major discoveries of Dr Bhattacharya during the famous Ramdhenu Era are deemed to be the top Assamese and Indian litterateurs of the second half of the 20th century, and their reign writ large over the social conscience of the Assamese nationhood in the early decades of the 21st century. His most prominent literary discoveries of during the Ramdhenu Era who left undeniable mark in different domains of Assamese literature during the next half century and more till the dawn of 21st century are Lakshmi Nandan Bora, Bhabendra Nath Saikia, Saurav Kumar Chaliha, Navakanta Barua, Bhabananda Deka, Nirmal Prabha Bordoloi, Padma Barkataki, Homen Borgohain, Hiren Bhattacharya, Chandraprasad Saikia, Nilmoni Phukan Sr, Hiren Gohain, Mamoni Raisom Goswami and several others. Even after Ramdhenu stopped publication, Dr Bhattacharya remained active as the leading Indian literary critic, and continued his mission of discovering extraordinary literary talents in Assam. He used to write literary criticism and reviews of much younger authors till the mid-1980s, if he found unparalleled literary works having bright promise to emerge as influential writers in the next few decades. His penultimate literary discovery was a school student named Arnab Jan Deka, about whose first published book Ephanki Rhode('A Stanza of Sunlight'), published during his school-student days as 10th standard matriculate in 1983, Dr Bhattacharya wrote his swan-song critical literary article, which was published in a literary journal Gandhaar in 1987. Through such magnanimity and impartial literary credentials, Dr Bhattacharya became part of legend and folklore in the domain of Indian literature during his lifetime. His gift of discovering extraordinary literary talents and further acts of selfless promotion of such genuine such writers made his a part of legend and folklore during his lifetime.

Works

Novels 
 Dhanpur Lashkar (1986)
 Rajpathe Ringiay (1957)
 Aai (1958)
 Yaruingam (1960) - Sahitya Akademi Award winning novel
 Sataghni (1964)
 Mrityunjay (1979)  - Jnanpith award winning novel
 Pratipaad
 Ranga Megh
 Billari
 Daaini
 Love in the Time of Insurgency
 Blossoms in the Graveyard

Other works 
 Kolong Aajiu Boi (1962) - collection of short stories
 Satsori (1963) - collection of short stories
 published some poems in the magazine Jayanthi.

See also
 List of Indian writers

References

External links
 Birendra Kumar Bhattacharyya Profile

Asom Sahitya Sabha Presidents
Recipients of the Jnanpith Award
Writers from Northeast India
Novelists from Assam
Indian male novelists
Recipients of the Sahitya Akademi Award in Assamese
People from Jorhat district
1924 births
1997 deaths
Cotton College, Guwahati alumni
Gauhati University alumni
20th-century Indian novelists
20th-century Indian male writers
Assamese-language writers
Writers from Assam